Henry Baldwin may refer to:

 Henry P. Baldwin (1814–1892), U.S. Senator from Michigan
 Henry Baldwin (judge) (1780–1844), U.S. Congressman from Pennsylvania and Associate Justice of the Supreme Court
 Henry Alexander Baldwin (1871–1946), businessman and U.S. Congressman from Hawaii known as "Harry"
 Henry Baldwin (baseball) (1894–1964), American baseball player
 Henry Perrine Baldwin (1842–1911), co-founder of Alexander & Baldwin, father of Harry

See also
 Henry Baldwin Harrison (1821–1901), Republican politician and Governor
 Henry Baldwin Hyde (1834–1899), American businessman
 Harry Baldwin (disambiguation)